Alan Brandi Cuasnicú (born 24 November 1987) is an Argentine professional futsal player who plays for Jaén FS of First Division of LNFS and the Argentina national team.

Honours
Benfica
 Liga Portuguesa: 2014–15
 Taça de Portugal: 2014–15
 Supertaça de Portugal: 2015
Jaén
Copa de España: 2018
Argentina
FIFA Futsal World Cup: 2016

External links
Acqua e Sapone profile 

1987 births
Living people
Futsal forwards
Citizens of Argentina through descent
Argentine people of Italian descent
Argentine men's futsal players
S.L. Benfica futsal players
Argentine expatriate sportspeople in Portugal
Argentine expatriate sportspeople in Italy
Spanish men's futsal players
Sportspeople from Las Palmas
Spanish people of Argentine descent
Spanish expatriate sportspeople in Portugal
Spanish expatriate sportspeople in Italy